Əmirməhmud (also, Əmirmahmud and Emirmakhmud) is a village in the Agdash Rayon of Azerbaijan.  The village forms part of the municipality of Şəmsabad.

References 

Populated places in Agdash District